Insaaf may refer to:

 Insaaf (1937 film), a Bollywood film of 1937
 Insaaf (1946 film), starring David Abraham Cheulkar
 Insaaf (1956 film), a Bollywood film of 1956
 Insaaf (1960 film), a Pakistani film of 1960
 Insaaf (1966 film), a Bollywood film of 1966
 Insaaf (1973 film)
 Insaaf (1987 film)
 Insaaf (1997 film)
 Insaaf (2011 film), a 2011 Maldivian film
 Insaaf: The Justice, a 2004 film